Harry Paul Gauss (29 September 1952 in Stuttgart, West Germany – 31 October 2009 in London, Ontario) was a German-born Canadian soccer businessman, head coach, general manager, and soccer player.

Gauss was a noted soccer promoter primarily involved with London City SC, a club formed by his father Markus Gauss in 1973. His involvement with the club was felt in every aspect from player to administrative, and to managerial duties. He operated with London originally in the National Soccer League (NSL), and ultimately in the NSL's successor league the Canadian Soccer League (CSL). Under the tutelage of the Gauss family the club established a reputation for providing an opportunities, and developing young players to higher professional endeavors. In 2006, he was diagnosed with brain cancer, and subsequently died three years later after complications from surgery.

Upon his death his sons Ryan, and Sean primarily ran the organization until their sale of the club in late 2011. His contributions were recognized by the Ontario Soccer Association, and the Canadian Soccer League with the latter creating the Harry Paul Gauss Award in recognition of his commitment, and loyalty in promoting professional soccer.

Career

London City 
Gauss played in the National Soccer League in 1971 with London German Canadians. He re-signed with London for the 1972 season. In 1973, his father Markus Gauss the former vice-president of German Canadian FC formed London City after acquiring the club's National Soccer League franchise rights. The elder Gauss would serve as the club's president, while his son Harry originally featured as a player for the organization. After a short stint as a player Harry began making the transition to the administrative field as the club's general manager. In 1979, a notable event occurred at the NSL annual general meeting, where several club representatives were rejected access to the meeting after London City representative Harry forwarded the motion of expelling club members who had failed in paying league dues. After departing the league in 1984 the team returned for the 1990 season after purchasing the rights from London Marconi.

He would also incorporate the role of head coach into his resume as he assumed the responsibility for the 1990 season. In 1993, the Canadian Soccer League merged with the NSL to form the Canadian National Soccer League (CNSL), where Gauss was named a league director. In 1998, the CNSL formed an alliance with the Ontario Soccer Association, and created the Canadian Professional Soccer League (CPSL) with London City as a charter member. Gauss accomplished his most notable achievement as a head coach in the 2003 Open Canada Cup tournament, where he secured the club's first piece of silverware. In 2004, he was selected as the head coach for the CPSL all-star match against Boavista F.C.

In 2007, he stepped a side from his active club role to concentrate on his health after being diagnosed with cancer and turned club operations over to his son Ryan. The Ontario Soccer Association awarded him for his 20 years of services to the sport with the Individual Meritorious Service Award. The Canadian Soccer League honored him by establishing the Harry Paul Gauss Award for individuals within the league who had demonstrated support, commitment and allegiance. On 31 October 2009 he lost a three-year battle with brain cancer after undergoing a 12-hour operation, a week before Christmas in 2006. In 2010, he was posthumously inducted into the Western Ontario Soccer League Hall of Fame.

Gauss was instrumental in establishing London City as a developing ground by providing experience to young players to the professional level.

Windsor and Port Huron 
After three seasons as general manager for London City he accepted an offer in 1977 from league rivals Windsor Stars in the capacity of general manager. During his tenure in Windsor he secured the services of Jim Townsend as head coach, and fielded a U-21 team as a reserve unit. Gauss time with Windsor was short lived as he resigned citing a personality conflict with club president Norm Feuer. After his departure head coach Townsend assumed his responsibilities.

In 1981, the Gauss family purchased the franchise rights of Toronto Canadians with intentions of relocating the team to Port Huron, Michigan. The NSL league board of directors approved of the transfer with intentions of operating in the 1982 season. League president George MacDonald, and commissioner Job Jones inspected Memorial Stadium, and reported their findings to the league members. Issues arose with obtaining a rental agreement contract with the Port Huron Area School District Board of Education for the usage of Memorial Stadium. The main obstacle to the agreement was a district bylaw preventing the usage of school facilities to outside parties.

In 2001, Gauss along with several investors submitted a proposal for a Windsor franchise in the Canadian Professional Soccer League.

Personal life
Harry Gauss' father Markus and mother Magdalene migrated with Harry and brother Reinhart from Stuttgart, Germany to Canada in 1958. Gauss was raised in Ontario following a short stay in Montreal and Winnipeg, while his sister Linda was born in Canada. Gauss was married to his wife Kathleen for over 30 years. The couple had three sons; Paul, Sean and Ryan. His sons were involved in the operation of the club as well with Sean serving as head coach in the 2007 season. Ryan would assume the administrative and managerial duties of the club in 2007.

His father Markus was born in Filopova, a village in the Kingdom of Yugoslavia, and once settled in London, Ontario he established a masonry construction business. He became involved in soccer in 1958-59 originally with the German Canadians FC as a manager-coach. In 2003, he was inducted into the Western Ontario Soccer League Hall of Fame. In 2005, he was inducted into the London Sports Hall of Fame. He died on November 17, 2013 from cancer, while his wife Magdalene died in 2007.

Honors

London City
Open Canada Cup (1): 2003

References 

1951 births
2009 deaths
Businesspeople from London, Ontario
Deaths from brain cancer in Canada
Canadian people of German descent
Canadian soccer coaches
Canadian soccer players
Canadian soccer chairmen and investors
German football managers
London City players
Soccer players from London, Ontario
Canadian National Soccer League players
Canadian Soccer League (1998–present) managers
Canadian National Soccer League coaches
Association footballers not categorized by position